The 1991–92 Toronto Maple Leafs season was Toronto's 75th season in the National Hockey League (NHL).

Off-season
Forward Wendel Clark is named team captain, following the departure of defenceman Rob Ramage to the Minnesota North Stars.

NHL draft

 Grant Fuhr was traded by Oilers with RW/LW Glenn Anderson and LW Craig Berube to the Toronto Maple Leafs for LW Vincent Damphousse, D Luke Richardson, G Peter Ing, C Scott Thornton and future considerations, September 19, 1991.

Regular season
After starting the season with a 2–1 record, a loss to the Washington Capitals on October 9 began what would become a seven-game losing streak. As the losses piled up, two intrepid Leafs fans from Wilfrid Laurier University went so far as to camp out on their Waterloo rooftop in hopes of inspiring the team to finally win. Enduring poor weather and the scorn of non-Leafs fans across their campus, Brian Gear and Fab Antonelli became minor media celebrities during their quixotic quest. After a disheartening loss to the Detroit Red Wings on October 25, the weary pair were finally able to return to their own beds when the Leafs defeated the Red Wings 6–1 on October 26.

On February 5, 1992, the Leafs scored just 18 seconds into the overtime period to win by a score of 3–2 over the Minnesota North Stars. It would prove to be the fastest overtime goal scored during the 1991–92 regular season.

The Maple Leafs were still in the playoff race with the Minnesota North Stars by mid March, but a 3–5–0 finish to the season ended any playoff hopes. Despite finishing with fewer wins than Toronto, the North Stars clinched the final playoff spot over the Leafs, costing head coach Tom Watt his job.

During the regular season, the Maple Leafs tied the Montreal Canadiens for the fewest short-handed goals allowed, with just five.

The Doug Gilmour trade
Several months after the Maple Leafs hired Cliff Fletcher to be their new general manager, Fletcher made a blockbuster trade with the Calgary Flames (where he had previously been general manager). On January 2, 1992, the Maple Leafs acquired Doug Gilmour, along with Jamie Macoun, Ric Nattress, Kent Manderville and Rick Wamsley, in exchange for Gary Leeman, Alexander Godynyuk, Jeff Reese, Michel Petit and Craig Berube. The ten-player trade was the largest in NHL history and, statistically speaking, one of the most lopsided.

Season standings

Schedule and results

Playoffs
The Maple Leafs missed the playoffs for the second consecutive year.

Player statistics

Forwards
Note: GP= Games played; G= Goals; A= Assists; Pts = Points; PIM = Penalties in minutes

Defencemen
Note: GP= Games played; G= Goals; A= Assists; Pts = Points; PIM = Penalties in minutes

Goaltending
Note: GP= Games played; W= Wins; L= Losses; T = Ties; SO = Shutouts; GAA = Goals Against Average

Transactions
The Maple Leafs have been involved in the following transactions during the 1991–92 season.

Trades

Expansion Draft

Free agents

Awards and records
 Grant Fuhr, Molson Cup (Most game star selections for Toronto Maple Leafs)

Farm teams
 The Toronto Maple Leafs farm team was based in the American Hockey League. The farm team relocated from Newmarket, Ontario to St. John's, Newfoundland. The St. John's Maple Leafs were coached by Marc Crawford and qualified for the 1992 Calder Cup Finals. The St. John's team played the Adirondack Red Wings in the finals. Said finals lasted seven games and each game was won by the home team. Adirondack prevailed in the finals and were led by former Toronto Maple Leafs goalie Allan Bester, who would go on to win the Jack A. Butterfield Trophy.

References
 Maple Leafs on Hockey Database
 Game log at Database Hockey

Toronto Maple Leafs seasons
Toronto Maple Leafs season, 1991-92
Toronto